Bradley Billington (born 1970) is a male former international table tennis player from England.

Table tennis career
He represented England at the 1997 World Table Tennis Championships in the Swaythling Cup (men's team event) with Alan Cooke, Carl Prean, Matthew Syed and Alex Perry.

He also won two English National Table Tennis Championships titles.

See also
 List of England players at the World Team Table Tennis Championships

References

1970 births
Living people
English male table tennis players